'Ammu Aahotepre was a Hyksos pharaoh of the 14th Dynasty who ruled from Avaris over the eastern Nile Delta. His reign is believed to have lasted about 15 years, from 1760 BC until 1745 BC. As Aahotepre reigned during Egypt's fragmented Second Intermediate Period, it is difficult to date his reign precisely.

Attestations 
Like other kings of the dynasty, scarab seals are the only surviving evidence for his reign. 'Ammu Aahotepre has 61 seals bearing his name: 30 for the nomen 'Ammu and 31 for the prenomen Aahotepre.

Identification
Ryholt (1997) identified 'Ammu with Aahotepre in his reconstruction of the Turin canon. Von Beckerath (1964) had previously assigned the prenomen Aahotepre to a pharaoh of the Sixteenth dynasty of Egypt.

See also
 List of pharaohs
 Aamu

References

Bibliography

.

18th-century BC Pharaohs
17th-century BC Pharaohs
Pharaohs of the Fourteenth Dynasty of Egypt